Dwayne Thompson (born October 6, 1950) is an American politician. He is a Democrat representing District 96 in the Tennessee House of Representatives.

Political career 

In 2014, Thompson ran for election to represent District 10 in the Tennessee House of Representatives, but lost to Republican incumbent Steve McManus. In 2016, he ran again, and defeated McManus in a race decided by 365 votes. Thompson was re-elected in 2018, and is running again in 2020.

As of June 2020, Thompson sits on the following committees:
 Consumer and Human Resources Committee
 Consumer and Human Resources Subcommittee
 Insurance Committee
 Property & Casualty Subcommittee

Electoral record 

Thompson was unopposed in the 2018 Democratic primary for the District 96 seat.

References 

Living people
Democratic Party members of the Tennessee House of Representatives
1950 births
Politicians from Memphis, Tennessee
People from Cordova, Tennessee
University of Memphis alumni
21st-century American politicians